The 1975 Mediterranean Games, officially known as the VII Mediterranean Games, and commonly known as Algiers 1975, were the 7th Mediterranean Games. The Games were held in Algiers, Algeria, from 23 August to 6 September 1975, where 2,444 athletes (2,095 men and 349 women) from 15 countries participated. There were a total of 160 medal events from 19 different sports.

Participating nations
The following is a list of nations that participated in the 1975 Mediterranean Games:

Sports

Medal table

References

External links
Official website – CIJM
Mediterranean Games Athletic results – GBR Athletics website

 
Mediterranean Games
International sports competitions hosted by Algeria
Sport in Algiers
Mediterranean Games
Multi-sport events in Algeria
Mediterranean Games by year
20th century in Algiers
Mediterranean Games
Mediterranean Games